Luzin may refer to:

 Nikolai Luzin (1883–1950), Russian mathematician
 Lusin's theorem, named after Nikolai Luzin
 5096 Luzin (1983 RC5), a main-belt asteroid 
 Breiter Luzin, a lake in Mecklenburg-Vorpommern, Germany
 Schmaler Luzin, a lake in Landkreis Mecklenburg-Strelitz, Mecklenburg-Vorpommern, Germany
 Luzin (crater), an impact crater on Mars in the Arabia quadrangle

See also
 Lusin (disambiguation)
 Luzi

Russian-language surnames